USS Transfer was a steam-propelled, derrick-rigged freight lighter.

Transfer spent her entire Navy career in the 3rd Naval District assigned to the New York Navy Yard. Though initially carried on the Navy list as a tugboat, she performed all varied duties of a freight lighter, primarily transporting people, cargo, stores, and other items between ships and shore.

Records documenting the milestones of the ship's career are sparse; but according to DANFS we can assume that she was commissioned sometime during her first dozen years of service since documents indicate that she was decommissioned on 6 October 1922. She remained in that status until 6 February 1924 when she was recommissioned to replace . Ten years later,  took over her duties; and Transfer was decommissioned once again on 8 February 1934.

Transfer apparently remained out of commission for the remainder of her career, though in all probability, she continued to serve the Navy. Little is known of her service, but her boiler plant provided heat to the cruisers  and  during the winter of 1938 and 1939 while the former underwent post-shakedown availability and the latter completed construction. On 8 March 1941, Transfer received the alpha-numeric designation, IX-46. Transfers name was struck from the Navy list on 16 September 1945 as a result of an inspection and survey. In January 1945, the Commandant, 3rd Naval District, was authorized to dispose of her and sold her for scrapping on 8 April 1945.

References

Ships built in Brooklyn
1905 ships
Unclassified miscellaneous vessels of the United States Navy
World War I auxiliary ships of the United States
World War II auxiliary ships of the United States